Eucalyptus amplifolia, commonly known as the cabbage gum, is a tree that is endemic to eastern Australia. It has smooth bark on its trunk and branches, lance-shaped leaves, and buds in groups of between seven and fifteen or more. The flowers are white and the fruit are woody hemispherical capsules. It is common on the coastal areas and tablelands of New South Wales and adjacent areas in south eastern Queensland, occurring as far south as Bega.

Description
It has smooth, often blotchy, white, cream, yellow, grey, pink or blue-grey bark throughout the trunk and branches, usually with loose, flaking grey slabs persistent at the base and lower trunk. Side-veins are 45° or greater to the midrib, and the leaves are of a dull or glossy green of the same hue both sides of the leaf.

There are three or four upward-pointing valves on the top of the fruit.

Taxonomy and naming
Eucalyptus amplifolia was first formally described in 1891 by Charles Victor Naudin who published the description in Description and emploi des Eucalyptus: introduits en Europe principalement en France et en Algerie: second memoire. The specific epithet (amplifolia) is derived from the Latin words amplus meaning "large" and folium meaning "leaf", referring to the large leaves of this eucalypt.

In 1990, Lawrie Johnson and Ken Hill described two subspecies of Eucalyptus amplifolia:
 Eucalyptus amplifolia subsp. amplifolia has buds and fruit with a distinct pedicel;
 Eucalyptus amplifolia subsp. sessiliflora lacks a distinct pedicel.

Distribution and habitat
Cabbage gum grows in grassy woodland and forest, often in depressions and on river flats.
 Subspecies amplifolia is found on the coastal plains of New South Wales from Taree to Batemans Bay with disjunct populations as far north as Coffs Harbour as well as in the Megalong Valley and on the Southern Tablelands near Goulburn.
 Subspecies sessiliflora grows in northern New South Wales, occurring in the Tenterfield, Armidale and Casino districts and in adjacent areas in Queensland.

Gallery

References

amplifolia
Myrtales of Australia
Flora of New South Wales
Flora of Queensland
Trees of Australia